Victoria Aveyard (born July 27, 1990) is an American writer of young adult and fantasy fiction and screenplays. She is known for her fantasy novel Red Queen. Aveyard wrote the novel a year after graduating from University of Southern California's screenwriting program in 2012. Sony Pictures teamed up with her to write spec screenplay Eternal.

Early life
Aveyard was born on July 27, 1990 and raised in a small town in Western Massachusetts. Her parents are public school teachers. She moved to California at the age of eighteen after she was accepted into the University of Southern California, where she studied screenwriting. She is of Scottish and Italian descent and resides in Santa Monica, where she lives with her husband and dog.

Career
Aveyard finished her first novel, Red Queen, after she graduated from college. She was inspired to write Red Queen after she graduated from college with a lot of student loan debt and did not see any way to get out of it. Aveyard did not traditionally query; she signed with Suzie Townsend after she heard about her work when she was at USC's writing program. Red Queen was published in 2015 and was met with positive reviews, for praise with its storyline and diversity within the characters and plot twists. Red Queen was the recipient of the Goodreads Choice Award for Debut Goodreads Author. Three sequels and one prequel came after. Originally, Red Queen was planned to be a film franchise with universal and Elizabeth Banks directing. In 2021, it was announced that the project will be a television series with Peacock, with Banks directing and appearing in a recurring role. Before production even began, Aveyard announced on Instagram that the series was renewed for a second season. Aveyard also wrote the pilot script for Red Queen.

Aveyard released another book series called Realm Breaker which has reached number one on the New York Times bestseller list.

Bibliography

Red Queen
 Red Queen (2015)
 Glass Sword (2016)
 King's Cage (2017)
 War Storm (2018)

Novellas
 Cruel Crown (2016, collects both the novellas Queen Song and Steel Scars)
 Queen Song (2015)
 Steel Scars (2016)
 Broken Throne (2019)
(Contains Queen Song and Steel Scars, as well as original novellas)

Realm Breaker 

 Realm Breaker (2021)
 Blade Breaker (2022)
 TBA

References

External links

 Personal blog

American women novelists
American fantasy writers
Living people
People from East Longmeadow, Massachusetts
Novelists from Massachusetts
21st-century American novelists
USC School of Cinematic Arts alumni
21st-century American women writers
Women science fiction and fantasy writers
1990 births